Gotham Knight or Gotham Knights  refer to:

Batman
Batman: Gotham Knight, a 2008 animated superhero anthology film
Batman: Gotham Knights, a monthly American comic book series that was published by DC Comics
Gotham Knights (rugby union), a division III men's club in the Metropolitan New York Rugby Union
Gotham Knights (video game), a 2022 video game
Gotham Knights (TV series)